Diego Ezequiel Aguirre (born 11 January 1993) is an Argentine footballer who plays as a striker for Argentine club San Miguel.

Career
During his professional career, Aguirre mainly played for Argentinian lower leagues clubs. He also spent one season at Deportes Valdivia in the Chilean second tier, where he appeared in 12 matches and scored two goals.

In August 2017, he signed a contract with the Ukrainian First League side FC Arsenal Kyiv.

In the summer of 2018 he moved to Latvian club Spartaks Jūrmala.

References

External links
 
 

1993 births
Living people
Argentine footballers
People from La Matanza Partido
Association football forwards
Nueva Chicago footballers
Deportivo Español footballers
Deportivo Laferrere footballers
Deportivo Armenio footballers
Deportes Valdivia footballers
FC Arsenal Kyiv players
FK Spartaks Jūrmala players
Club Atlético San Miguel footballers
Primera B Metropolitana players
Primera Nacional players
Primera C Metropolitana players
Primera B de Chile players
Ukrainian First League players
Latvian Higher League players
Argentine expatriate footballers
Expatriate footballers in Chile
Argentine expatriate sportspeople in Chile
Expatriate footballers in Ukraine
Argentine expatriate sportspeople in Ukraine
Expatriate footballers in Latvia
Argentine expatriate sportspeople in Latvia
Sportspeople from Buenos Aires Province